Gymnázium Josefa Jungmanna is a Gymnasium located in Litoměřice in Ústecký kraj, Czech Republic. 

It is named after a Bohemian poet Josef Jungmann, who taught here from 1799 to 1815.

Present 
The gymnasium is the only school of its kind in Litoměřice. The building was built in the 17th century. There are 26 classrooms in the building.

Accomplishments 
In 2011, the school reached the highest Matura success rate out of all high schools in Ústecký kraj

External links 
 The official website of Gymnázium Josefa Jungmanna

Litoměřice District